The ancient Egyptian b-hieroglyph (Gardiner D58) represents a foot or lower leg.

Gallery

See also

Gardiner's Sign List#D. Parts of the Human Body
List of Egyptian hieroglyphs

References

Schumann-Antelme, and Rossini, 1998. Illustrated Hieroglyphics Handbook, Ruth Schumann-Antelme, and Stéphane Rossini. c 1998, English trans. 2002, Sterling Publishing Co. (Index, Summary lists (tables), selected uniliterals, biliterals, and triliterals.) (softcover)
Egyptian hieroglyphs: parts of the human body